A peritoneovenous shunt (also called LeVeen Shunt) is a shunt which drains peritoneal fluid from the peritoneum into veins, usually the internal jugular vein or the superior vena cava. It is sometimes used in patients with refractory ascites.

It is a long tube with a non-return valve running subcutaneously from the peritoneum to the internal jugular vein in the neck, which allows ascitic fluid to pass directly into the systemic circulation.

Possible complications include:
 Infection
 Superior vena caval thrombosis
 Pulmonary edema
 Bleeding from varices
 Disseminated intravascular coagulation

References

Implants (medicine)